Hubert Wulfranc (born 17 December 1956) is a French Communist politician who has represented Seine-Maritime's 3rd constituency in the National Assembly since 2017. He sits as part of the Democratic and Republican Left group.

References

External links 

 Biography at the French Parliament

1956 births
Living people
French Communist Party politicians
21st-century French politicians
Politicians from Rouen
Mayors of places in Normandy
Deputies of the 15th National Assembly of the French Fifth Republic
Deputies of the 16th National Assembly of the French Fifth Republic